Jean-Gabriel Prêtre (20 December 1768 – 29 April 1849) was a Swiss-French natural history painter who illustrated birds, mammals and reptiles in a large number of books. Several species of animal were named after him.

Biography

Prêtre was born in Geneva. His father Jean-Louis Prêtre married Judith Renauld on 28 December 1767 in the church of Saint Germain. From their marriage the children Pernette Marguerite, Jean-Gabriel and Marie were born.

He worked as a natural history illustrator, first for Empress Josephine's zoo, and then for the Natural History Museum in Paris. He illustrated many books of animals and birds, and had several species named after him.

Species named after Prêtre
A species of worm lizard, Amphisbaena pretrei, is named in his honor.

Works

Notes

References

 

1768 births
1849 deaths
Natural history illustrators
French painters
18th-century artists from the Republic of Geneva